Put Up or Shut Up is an EP by American rock band All Time Low released in 2006 through Hopeless Records.

Background
Five of the tracks are re-recordings of The Party Scene (2005) songs. The title originates from lyrics taken from "Break Out! Break Out!".

On March 28, 2006, it was announced that the band signed to Hopeless Records. The group finished recording Put Up or Shut Up in March, before embarking on a tour with Transition a month later. From August to October, the band supported Amber Pacific on their tour of the U.S.

Composition
Emily Zemler of Alternative Press called the tracks on the EP "bouncy pop-punk", while comparing the sound of the EP overall to Fall Out Boy and New Found Glory.

Reception

The EP has sold over 60,000 copies.

Track listing

 Tracks 2, 3, 5, 6, and 7 are all re-recordings of songs from The Party Scene.

Personnel
Personnel credits from Genius.

All Time Low
 Alex Gaskarth – lead vocals, rhythm guitar, songwriting
 Jack Barakat – lead guitar, backing vocals
 Zack Merrick – bass guitar, backing vocals
 Rian Dawson – drums, percussion
Production
 Paul Leavitt - production, engineering
 Zack Odom - mixing
 Kanneth Mount - mixing
 Gavin Lurssen - mastering

Charts

References

External links

Put Up or Shut Up (deluxe edition) at YouTube (streamed copy where licensed)

All Time Low EPs
2006 EPs
Hopeless Records EPs